is one of the ten wards in Sapporo, Hokkaido, Japan.
As of August 31, 2021, the ward has a population of 213,704.

History
1871: Shiroishi village was founded.
1873: Kamishiroishi village split off from Shiroishi village.
1902: Shiroishi village and kamishiroishi village were merged to form Shiroishi village.
1950: Shiroishi village was merged into Sapporo city.
1972: Sapporo was designated as one of the cities designated by government ordinance and Shiroishi-ku was established.
1989: Atsubetsu-ku split off from Shiroishi-ku.

Transportation

Rail
JR Hokkaido
 Hakodate Main Line: Shiroishi Station
 Chitose Line: Shiroishi - Heiwa
Sapporo Municipal Subway
 Tōzai Line: Kikusui - Higashi-Sapporo - Shiroishi - Nangō-Nana-Chōme - Nangō-Jūsan-Chōme - Nangō-Jūhatchōme

Road
 Hokkaido Expressway: Sapporo IC - Kitago IC - Oyachi IC
 Route 12
Route 274
Route 275

Education

High schools

Public 
 Hokkaido Sapporo Higashi High School
 Hokkaido Sapporo Shiroishi High School
 Hokkaido Sapporo Hakuryo High School

Private 
Clark Memorial International High School, Sapporo Shiroishi Campus

Mascots 

They are cute snowmen with rose motifs.
Shiroppy is a white active snowman who wears a red rose hat and cares about people. She is unveiled in July 2008.
Kuroppy is a grey selfish snowman who wears a blue rose hat and loves to bother people for fun. She is the rival of Shiroppy. She is unveiled on Februarys 2020.

Friendship city 
 Shiroishi, Miyagi

References

External links
 Shiroishi-ku word office 

Wards of Sapporo